The Grammy Nominees is a series of various artists compilation albums celebrating the best of the music industry. Albums are released before the airing of the annual Grammy Awards. All of the songs on the albums are Grammy nominated in the year released. The first one of these albums was released in 1995 and has been released every year since. Each one through the 2007 edition has been certified Gold by the Recording Industry Association of America (RIAA), while the 1996 and 2000 editions have also been certified Platinum.

Other Grammy series albums have also been attempted for rap (1999–2001) and Latin music (1998–2005) nominees.

No CD had been released since 2020.

1995 
1995 Grammy Nominees is the first edition of the long-running series and covered the top contenders for the 37th Annual Grammy Awards. Released on February 7, 1995, it entered at number twenty-six on the Billboard 200 chart.

1996 
1996 Grammy Nominees covers the top contenders for the 38th Annual Grammy Awards, and became the series' first top 20 chart entry, peaking at number sixteen on the Billboard 200 chart.

1997 
1997 Grammy Nominees covers the top contenders for the 39th Annual Grammy Awards, and did two better than its predecessor in the series, hitting number fourteen on the Billboard 200 chart.

1998 
1998 Grammy Nominees covers the top contenders for the 40th Annual Grammy Awards and just missed hitting the top 10 of the Billboard 200 chart, peaking at number eleven.

1999 
1999 Grammy Nominees covers the top contenders for the 41st Annual Grammy Awards, and became the series' first top 10 entry on the Billboard 200, peaking at number eight.

2000 
Grammy Nominees 2000 covers the top contenders for the 42nd Annual Grammy Awards. It became the series' second top ten entry on the Billboard 200 chart, peaking at number nine.

Year-end charts

2001 
Grammy Nominees 2001 covers the top contenders for the 43rd Annual Grammy Awards. Unlike its two predecessors in the series, it failed to reach the top 10 of the Billboard 200 chart, instead only peaking at number twelve.

2002 
Grammy Nominees 2002 covers the top contenders for the 44th Annual Grammy Awards, and, like the 2001 edition, peaked outside the top ten on the Billboard 200 chart, peaking at number thirteen.

2003 
Grammy Nominees 2003 covers the top contenders for the 45th Annual Grammy Awards, and returned the series to the top 10 of the Billboard 200 chart, peaking at number six.

2004 
2004 Grammy Nominees covers the top contenders for the 46th Annual Grammy Awards, and debuted at number four on the Billboard 200 chart, becoming, at that point, the series' highest-charting volume.

2005 
2005 Grammy Nominees covers the top contenders for the 47th Annual Grammy Awards, and matched the series' best chart peak of number four on the Billboard 200 chart.

2006 
2006 Grammy Nominees covers the top contenders for the 48th Annual Grammy Awards. It failed to reach the top 10 of the Billboard 200 chart, instead peaking at number 14.

2007 
Grammy Nominees 2007 covers the top contenders for the 49th Annual Grammy Awards, and is, thus far, the highest-charting album in the series, debuting at number three on the Billboard 200 chart.

2008 
Grammy Nominees 2008 covers the top contenders for the 50th Annual Grammy Awards, and debuted at number four on the Billboard 200 chart.

2009 
Grammy Nominees 2009 covers the top contenders for the 51st Annual Grammy Awards and debuted at number six on the Billboard 200 chart.

2010 
Grammy Nominees 2010 covers the top contenders for the 52nd Annual Grammy Awards. It debuted at number five on the Billboard 200 chart. The album has sold 235,000 copies as of March 2010.

2011 
The track listing for 2011 Grammy Nominees was revealed on January 6, 2011, and the album was released on January 25, 2011. It covers the top contenders for the 53rd Annual Grammy Awards. The album has sold 204,000 copies as of April 2011.

2012 
The 2012 edition was released on January 24, 2012, and covers the top contenders for the 54th Annual Grammy Awards. The album has sold 323,000 copies as of May 2012.

2013 
2013 Grammy Nominees covers the top contenders for the 55th Annual Grammy Awards.  The album has sold 315,000 copies as of May 2013.

2014 
Grammy Nominees 2014 covers the top contenders for the 56th Annual Grammy Awards.  The album has sold 309,000 copies in the US as of July 2014.

2015 
2015 Grammy Nominees covers the Record of the Year, Album of the Year, Song of the Year, Best Pop Vocal Album, Best Pop Solo Performance, and Best Country Duo/Group Performance nominees for the 57th Annual Grammy Awards.

The album debuted at number 12 on the US Billboard 200 on the week dated February 7, 2015, and peaked at number 9 three weeks later. It also peaked at number 2 on the Canadian Albums Chart.

2016 

2016 Grammy Nominees covers the Record of the Year, Album of the Year, Song of the Year, Best New Artist, Best Pop Duo/Group Performance, and Best Country Solo Performance nominees for the 58th Annual Grammy Awards.

2017 

2017 Grammy Nominees covers the Record of the Year, Album of the Year, Best New Artist, Best Pop Solo Performance, Best Pop Duo/Group Performance, Best Pop Vocal Album, Best Country Song and Best Country Solo Performance nominees for the 59th Annual Grammy Awards.

2018 

2018 Grammy Nominees covers the Record of the Year, Album of the Year, Best Pop Solo Performance, Best Pop Duo/Group Performance, and Best Country Album nominees for the 60th Annual Grammy Awards.

2019 

2019 Grammy Nominees covers the Record of the Year, Album of the Year, Best Pop Vocal Album and Best Pop Duo/Group Performance nominees for the 61st Annual Grammy Awards.

2020

2020 Grammy Nominees covers the Record of the Year, Album of the Year, Best Pop Vocal Album, Best Pop Duo/Group Performance and Best Country Duo/Group Performance nominees for the 62nd Annual Grammy Awards.

Charts

See also 
 Grammy Rap Nominees
 Grammy Award

References 

Sony Music compilation albums
PolyGram compilation albums
MCA Records compilation albums
Elektra Records compilation albums
RCA Records compilation albums
Capitol Records compilation albums
Universal Music Group compilation albums
Rhino Records compilation albums
Jive Records compilation albums
1990s compilation albums
2000s compilation albums
2010s compilation albums
Grammy Awards